Spheres is the sixth studio album by Canadian industrial/electronic music group Delerium in 1994 (see 1994 in music).

Track listing
"Monolith" – 10:03
"Transmitter" – 13:36
"Wavelength" – 13:22
"Colony" – 12:06
"Dark Matter" – 7:30
"Cloud Barrier" – 6:42
"Turmoil" (Bonus track on Re-Release) – 3:43

Other
This album presents samples from Vangelis' 1492: Conquest of Paradise and Stanley Kubrick's A Space Odyssey
The track "Dark Matter" appears on the electronic/ambient compilation Space Daze, 1994 Cleopatra Records.

References

Delerium albums
1994 albums
Albums produced by Rhys Fulber